Macropoma (from Greek   μακρός "large" + πόμα "cover", after its large operculum) is an extinct genus of coelacanth in the class Sarcopterygii. Fossils of Macropoma have been found in both England and Czech Republic, dating to the mid-Cretaceous (Albian-Turonian). Recorded fossils have bodies under two feet in length. A modern coelacanth measures five or more, but in other respects the two genera are remarkably similar, and share the same body plan with a three-lobed tail and stalked fins.

Macropoma grew to a length of 22 inches (55 centimeters) and would have preyed upon smaller aquatic species.

References

 Barry Cox, Colin Harrison, R.J.G. Savage, and Brian Gardiner. (1999): The Simon & Schuster Encyclopedia of Dinosaurs and Prehistoric Creatures: A Visual Who's Who of Prehistoric Life. Simon & Schuster. 
 David Norman. (2001): The Big Book Of Dinosaurs.  page 61, Walcome books.
 Parker, Steve. Dinosaurus: the complete guide to dinosaurs. Firefly Books Inc, 2003. Pg. 69

Prehistoric lobe-finned fish genera
Cretaceous fish of Europe
Latimeriidae
Taxa named by Louis Agassiz
Fossil taxa described in 1835